A rant or diatribe is a kind of oration.

Rant(s) or The Rant(s) may also refer to:

Literature
Rant (novel), a 2007 novel by Chuck Palahniuk
The Rants, a book by Dennis Miller
Rant, a type of character in Leven Thumps

Music
Rant (Ian Hunter album) (2001)
Rant (The Futureheads album) (2012)
RANT, Scottish chamber-folk quartet whose members have included Jenna Reid, Lauren MacColl and Gillian Frame
A lively Scottish tune; see "MacPherson's Rant"
A traditional dance-step, originating in the UK; see Music of Northumbria

Other uses
"The Rant", a commercial in the I Am Canadian media campaign for Molson Canadian Beer
Ranter, member of a seventeenth-century English religious movement

People with the surname
Christopher Rants (born 1967), American politician from Iowa
James Rant (1936–2003), British judge and Judge Advocate General
Thomas Rant (1604–1671), English lawyer and Member of Parliament in 1660
Zoran Rant (1904–1972), Slovene mechanical engineer, scientist and professor

See also
RANTES or CCL5, a human protein
RantMedia, a media organization